Jimmy Gressier (born 4 May 1997) is a French middle- and long-distance runner. He won gold medals in the 5000 metres and 10,000 metres at the 2019 European Under-23 Championships. Gressier claimed four individual medals at the European Cross Country Championships, including three U23 titles. He is the European record holder for the 5 km road race.

European 5 km road record
Jimmy Gressier held European 5 km road race record of 13:18 from February 2020 until April 2022, when Italy's Yemaneberhan Crippa set a new continental best mark of 13:14. On 12 February 2023, Gressier regained his record at the Monaco Run – 5 km Herculis with a time of 13:12.

Miscellaneous
Gressier is known for race finish celebrations. At the 2018 edition of the European cross country while in first place at the end of the U23 race he attempted a football player like knee slide but ended up falling flat on his face as he crossed the line. At the 2019 edition of the same race Gressier was so far clear of the other competitors that he walked across the line.

Achievments

International competitions

Personal bests
 800 metres – 1:54.33 (Calais 2017)
 1000 metres – 2:24.84 (Saint-Pol-sur-Ternoise 2017)
 1500 metres – 3:35.97 (Marseille 2021)
 1500 metres indoor – 3:37.41 (Metz 2022)
 3000 metres – 7:53.81 (Montgeron 2018)
 3000 metres indoor – 7:39.70 (Karlsruhe 2021)
 5000 metres – 13:08.75 (Paris 2022)
 10,000 metres – 27:24.51 (Pacé 2022)
  3000 m steeplechase – 8:24.72 (Décines 2020)
Road
 5 kilometres – 13:12 (Monaco 2023) European record
 10 kilometres – 27:40 (Valencia 2023)

References

1997 births
Living people
French male middle-distance runners
French male long-distance runners
People from Boulogne-sur-Mer
Athletes (track and field) at the 2018 Mediterranean Games
Mediterranean Games competitors for France
Athletes (track and field) at the 2020 Summer Olympics
Olympic athletes of France
Sportspeople from Pas-de-Calais
20th-century French people
21st-century French people